Troy Westwood (born March 21, 1967) is a former professional Canadian football place kicker and punter who played 18 years for the Winnipeg Blue Bombers of the Canadian Football League. He was drafted 48th overall in the 6th round of the 1991 CFL Draft by the Blue Bombers and holds several club records, including most points scored in a career (2748) and most points scored in a single season (213).

Early life
Westwood was born in Dauphin, Manitoba and raised in Winnipeg. He attended Augustana University in Sioux Falls, South Dakota and graduated in 1991. He played college football for the Augustana College Vikings and was inducted into their Hall of Fame in 2011. Westwood was a gifted youth soccer player, playing for the Manitoba provincial soccer team and invited to a camp for the U18 national team. He was drafted by the Winnipeg Fury of the Canadian Soccer League.

Professional career
Westwood was selected by the Bombers in the 1991 season, when he was selected 48th overall in the 6th round of the Canadian College Draft. Westwood was also known for his mullet, which he reportedly vowed not to cut until he wins the Grey Cup.  He decided to grow it out after the 2001 Grey Cup loss to Calgary, in which he missed three out of four field goal attempts. In a radio interview, he publicly denied this claim and attributed his hair to his spirituality, and resents the notion that his hair has anything to do with football. This poor performance capped off what was Westwood's worst season statistically as he only converted on 60.8% of his field goal attempts that year. 

After a disappointing start to the 2007 season against Edmonton, Westwood was told by Bomber coach Doug Berry not to dress for the second game of the season against Montreal.  After replacement Rob Pikula went 1/2 in field goals, Westwood was reinstated as the Bomber's place kicker by the third game of the season.  In the 7th game of the season however, Westwood sustained a hamstring injury and his future with the club was again in doubt. However, after injuries to Pikula and newly signed Pat Fleming, Westwood was called upon for kicking and punting duties in the Eastern Semi-Final where he went 1/2, kicking the game-winning field goal from 20 yards out with no time left on the clock.

Westwood was cut by the Bombers during training camp on June 15, 2008.

Westwood was re-signed by the Blue Bombers on Oct 19, 2009 to their practice roster following an injury to starting punter Mike Renaud and struggles by place kicker Alexis Serna to pull double duty.   On April, 2010, Westwood was released by the Blue Bombers.

He is known for stirring things up off-field: he has tried his hand at professional boxing and tap dancing, and had a public feud with Montreal Alouette Ed Philion. He is arguably most known for his tongue-in-cheek insult of the rival Saskatchewan Roughriders' fans by calling them "banjo-pickin' inbreds." He later followed that up with a faux apology, saying he did not think anyone in Saskatchewan was actually capable of playing a banjo. These quotes inspired the Banjo Bowl.

Career stats

Regular season

Music
Westwood, who was exposed to First Nations culture growing up in Dauphin, has also recorded several albums inspired by First Nations music, both in the band Eagle & Hawk and later as a solo artist named Little Hawk.

Broadcasting
After retiring from football, Westwood was an on-air host for CFQX-FM  in Winnipeg from March 2009 to March 2011. He was a morning host on CFRW, Winnipeg's TSN Radio station until the closing of the station by Bell Media in January 2021.

References

External links
 Troy Westwood profile on Blue Bombers site
 Little Hawk Music
 Aboriginal Peoples Choice music Awards, Artist profile page

1967 births
Living people
Augustana (South Dakota) Vikings football players
Canadian players of American football
Canadian football placekickers
Canadian rock singers
Sportspeople from Dauphin, Manitoba
Players of Canadian football from Manitoba
Winnipeg Blue Bombers players
Canadian radio sportscasters